Matthew Kennedy (born 6 April 1997) is a professional Australian rules footballer playing for the Carlton Football Club in the Australian Football League (AFL). He previously played for the Greater Western Sydney Giants from 2016 to 2017. Kennedy is from the small town of Collingullie, New South Wales. He participated in the Auskick program at Collingullie. He and Giants teammate Harry Perryman played together for most of their junior career. Perryman was recruited from Collingullie-Glenfield Park Football Club in the Riverina Football Netball League, where he played in consecutive senior premierships in 2014 and 2015. In an impressive performance, he kicked three goals as the Giants defeated Essendon by a 27 points. In October 2017, Kennedy was traded to Carlton.

Carlton demoted Kennedy to the rookie at the end of the 2020 season to make salary cap space due to the coronavirus pandemic; but after a successful 2021 season he was re-elevated to the senior list for 2022.

References

External links

1997 births
Living people
Australian rules footballers from New South Wales
Carlton Football Club players
Greater Western Sydney Giants players
NSW/ACT Rams players
Australian Christians